Rit's House is an album by American guitarist Lee Ritenour released in 2002, and recorded for the GRP label. AllMusic praised Rit's House as "among his more memorable and substantial efforts". The album reached No. 4 on the Billboard jazz albums chart.

Track listing 
Module 105 (written by: Lee Ritenour) - 5:23
"13" (Gary McFarland) - 5:01
Mizrab (Gabor Szabo) - 5:26
78th and 3rd (Lee Ritenour) - 5:38
Rit's House (Lee Ritenour) - 5:05
A Little Dolphin Dreamin' (Lee Ritenour) - 5:14
Every Little Thing She Does Is Magic (Sting) - 4:02
Condor (Dave Grusin) - 5:14
Olinda (Lee Ritenour) - 5:11
Night Owl (Lee Ritenour / Mitch Holder) - 6:24
Party Time (Lee Morgan) - 4:19
Just Listen (Lee Ritenour) - 6:00

Personnel
Lee Ritenour - guitar
Mitch Holder - acoustic guitar (9)
Marcus Miller - bass (1, 3)
Dave Carpenter - acoustic bass (2, 7, 10, 11, 12)
Melvin Davis - bass (5, 6, 8, 9)
George Duke - Fender Rhodes (1, 3)
Randy Kerber - synthesizers (1, 6, 9); strings (1)
John Beasley - Fender Rhodes (2, 5, 7, 8); B-3 organ (6, 9); piano (6)
Joey DeFrancesco - B-3 organ (4)
Mark Stephens - B-3 organ (5)
Alan Pasqua - B-3 organ (10); piano (11, 12)
Vinnie Colaiuta - drums (1, 3, 5, 8, 9)
Will Kennedy - drums (2, 6, 7)
Byron Landham - drums (4)
Peter Erskine - drums (10, 11, 12)
Paulinho Da Costa - percussion (1, 2, 5, 6, 7, 8, 9)
Jochem van der Saag - sound design (1, 3, 7, 8); loops (1); percussion (3); samples (7); keyboards (7); synthesizers (8)
Ernie Watts - tenor saxophone (6, 8, 10, 11)
Dan Higgins - flute (1); tenor saxophone (2, 4, 5); alto flute (2); Indian flutes (9)
Jerry Hey - flugelhorn (1); trumpet (2, 4, 5, 11); horn arrangement (2, 5); synthesizer arrangement (6, 9)
Gary Grant - trumpet (2, 4, 5)
Bill Reichenbach - trombone (2, 4, 5)
Michael McDonald - lead & background vocals (7)

Charts

References

External links
Rit's House at Discogs
Rit's House at AllMusic
Lee Ritenour's Official Site

2002 albums
GRP Records albums
Lee Ritenour albums